Orest is a masculine given name which may refer to:

 Orest Banach (born 1948), German-American former soccer goalkeeper
 Orest Budyuk (born 1995), Ukrainian footballer
 Orest Grechka (born 1975), Ukrainian-American former soccer player
 Orest Kärm (1902–1944), Soviet Estonian politician
 Orest Khvolson (1852–1932), Russian physicist
 Orest Kindrachuk (born 1950), Canadian former National Hockey League player
 Orest Kiprensky (1782–1836), Russian portrait painter
 Orest Klympush (born 1941), Ukrainian engineer and politician
 Orest Kostyk (born 1999), Ukrainian football goalkeeper
 Orest Kryvoruchko (1942–2021), Ukrainian artist
 Orest Kuzyk (born 1995), Ukrainian footballer
 Orest V. Maresca (1914–2000), American politician
 Orest Meleschuk (born 1940), Canadian former curler
 Orest Lebedenko (born 1998), Ukrainian footballer
 Orest Lenczyk (born 1942), Polish football manager and former player
 Orest Levytsky (1848–1922), Ukrainian historian, ethnographer and writer
 Orest Onofrei (born 1957), Romanian politician
 Orest Panchyshyn (born 2000), Ukrainian footballer
 Orest Somov (1793–1833), Russian writer, critic, editor and publisher
 Orest Subtelny (1941–2016), Ukrainian-Canadian historian
 Orest Tereshchuk (born 1981), Ukrainian former tennis player
 Orest Zerebko (1887–1943), Galician-born Canadian journalist and politician

Masculine given names
Ukrainian masculine given names